Jean Lecomte (August 5, 1898 - March 28, 1979) was a French physicist, researcher and professor of physics at CNRS.

Career 

In 1919, Lecomte started working in the laboratory of physical research at the Sorbonne in Paris. Lecomte presented his Doctoral Thesis in 1924 on localized vibrations in molecules. He was one of the founding members of the European Congress on Molecular Spectroscopy (EUCMOS), together with French Nobel prize winning physicist Alfred Kastler (Paris) and German physicist Reinhard Mecke (Konstanz). Lecomte was elected as a member of the French Academy of Sciences (Physics Section) in 1959 and as president of the French Association for the Advancement of Science (L’Association française pour l’avancement des sciences) in 1968. He authored several books on Infrared spectroscopy.

References 

1898 births
1978 deaths
French physicists
Spectroscopists